Giacomo IV Crispo (died 1576) was the last Duke of the Archipelago in 1564–1566.

He succeeded his father Giovanni IV Crispo (r. 1517–64). In reality, he acknowledged himself in a letter from 1565 that he had little power: 
"We are now tributaries of the great emperor, Sultan 
Suleyman, and we are in evil plight, because of the 
difficulties of the times ; for now necessity reigns with 
embarrassment and pain for her ministers ; and, like 
plenipotentiaries or commissioners of others, we husband 
our opportunities as fate doth ordain."

When the duchy was attributed to Joseph Nasi in 1566, he fled to Venice, to which he ceded his titles to the duchy and whose service he entered. He served as an officer in the Ottoman–Venetian War of 1570–1573 over Cyprus, and died in Venice in 1576.

He was married to Cecilia Sommaripa and had three daughters and three sons.

References

1576 deaths
16th-century Italian nobility
Giacomo 04
Republic of Venice military personnel
Giacomo 04
Year of birth unknown
16th-century Italian military personnel